Fertilizer Corporation of India Township is a census town in Angul district  in the state of Odisha, India.

Demographics
 India census, Fertilizer Corporation of India Township had a population of 7059. Males constitute 53% of the population and females 47%. Fertilizer Corporation of India Township has an average literacy rate of 91%, higher than the national average of 59.5%: male literacy is 93%, and female literacy is 89%. In Fertilizer Corporation of India Township, 6% of the population is under 6 years of age.

References

Cities and towns in Angul district
Townships in India